American Thighs is the 1994 debut studio album by American alternative rock band Veruca Salt. The album features the hit single "Seether" and received positive critical reviews.

Background and release
Singer-guitarists Nina Gordon and Louise Post started working together in 1992. They eventually formed Veruca Salt with bassist Steve Lack and drummer Jim Shapiro, and the four had been a full band less than a year when they signed with the independent label Minty Fresh. In 1994, they released the single "Seether"/"All Hail Me". "Seether" became a hit on college and alternative radio stations, and the band recorded the album American Thighs with producer Brad Wood. The album was released through Minty Fresh on September 27, 1994, the title a reference to a line from the AC/DC song "You Shook Me All Night Long".

Veruca Salt then signed with the major label Geffen Records, which re-released the album. "Seether" became a hit on MTV. Two more singles, "Number One Blind" and "Victrola", were released from the album, but neither matched the success of "Seether". American Thighs was eventually certified gold.

Critical reception 

American Thighs received generally positive reviews from critics. Stephen Thomas Erlewine of AllMusic gave the album 4 stars out of 5, calling it "a pure pop album masquerading as the next big thing." Nick Kelly of Hot Press said, "Given that this is their first record, you can't help asking yourself how a band so young can sing songs so good." Eric Gladstone of CMJ New Music Monthly wrote that "the album works an infectious formula: thick harmonies layered over attack-formation guitars and drums, with lyrics shifting from childlike innocence to guiltless brutality."

Spin ranked it number 8 on its list of the 20 best albums of 1994. In 2014, Rolling Stone ranked it number 21 on its list of the 40 best alternative rock albums of 1994.

Track listing

Personnel 
Credits adapted from liner notes.

Veruca Salt
 Nina Gordon – guitar, vocals
 Louise Post – guitar, vocals
 Steve Lack – bass guitar
 Jim Shapiro – drums, background vocals

Additional musicians
 Christian Lane – additional vocals (on "Victrola")

Production
 Brad Wood – production, recording, mixing
 Casey Rice – additional engineering
 John McEntire – additional engineering
 Roger Seibel – mastering

Charts

References

External links 
 
 
 

1994 debut albums
Veruca Salt albums
Minty Fresh Records albums
Albums produced by Brad Wood